Dil Dhoondta Hai is an Indian Hindi romantic drama television series, which premiered on September 21, 2017 and aired on Zee TV (now available on ZEE5). The series was produced by Dashami Creations of Nitin Vaidya. The series aired on weekday's at 10:30pm . Stavan Shinde & Shivya Pathania played the main characters and Ashish Dixit & Pratiksha Jadhav in Second Pivotal lead role. it was replaced by Aap Ke Aa Jane Se in its time slot.

Plot
The story is about Raavi (Shivya Pathania), whose house in Punjab was a standalone accommodation with separate rooms for each family member, and Vishi (Stavan Shinde) who has a Maharashtrian family that stays in a small room in a Mumbai chawl.

Cast
 Stavan Shinde as Vishi or Vishvambar Dalvi.
 Shivya Pathania as Raavi.
 Ashish Dixit as Abhi or Abhijeet Dalvi.
 Pratiksha Jadhav as Bela.
 Purnima Talwalkar as Anjali Dalvi (Vishi's Mother)
 Rajan Bhise as Avinash Dalvi (Vishi's Father)
 Deepak Chadha as Daljit 
 Shadab Nadeem as Baldev
 Prabhjeet Kaur as Pam

References

External links
 

2017 Indian television series debuts
Hindi-language television shows
Indian television soap operas
Indian drama television series
Television shows set in Mumbai
Zee TV original programming
2018 Indian television series endings